The Ven Reginald George Henry McCahearty (13 June 1902 –  24 June 1966) was the first Archdeacon of Bromley.

He was born in Deal, Kent and educated at the Leeds University and College of the Resurrection, Mirfield and ordained in 1927.incumbencies at  Christ Church, Dartford; Christ Church, Milton-next-Gravesend, All Saints, Orpington and St Nicholas, Chislehurst.

References

Year of birth uncertain
Alumni of the University of Leeds
Alumni of the College of the Resurrection
Archdeacons of Bromley
1966 deaths
1902 births
People from Deal, Kent